James Te Manawanui Temuera Bell (born 2 May 1994) is a Scotland international rugby league footballer who plays as a  and er for St Helens in the Betfred Super League.

He previously played for the New Zealand Warriors in the NRL, the Leigh Centurions in the Super League, and Leigh and Toulouse Olympique in the Betfred Championship.

Background
Bell was born in Auckland, New Zealand, and is of Scottish and Māori descent.

He played his junior rugby league for the Papakura Sea Eagles, before being signed by the New Zealand Warriors.

Playing career

Early career
In 2014, Bell played for the New Zealand Warriors' NYC team. In October 2014, he played in the Warriors' 2014 NYC Grand Final win over the Brisbane Broncos. In 2015, he graduated to the Warriors' New South Wales Cup team and in 2016 he was named the side's man of the year. Also in 2016, he captained the New Zealand Māori rugby league team.

2017
Bell played in the 2017 NRL Auckland Nines.

After making over 50 appearances with the Warriors' reserve team, Bell made his NRL debut for the Warriors against the Cronulla-Sutherland Sharks in round 21 of the 2017 NRL season.

Leigh Centurions
On 5 November 2020 it was announced that Bell would join Leigh for the 2021 season.

St Helens R.F.C.
On 14 September 2021, it was reported that he had signed for St Helens R.F.C. (Heritage № 1270) in the Super League. Bell played 17 games for St Helens in the 2022 Super League season and featured in the clubs semi-final victory over Salford but he was not included in the grand final team which won their fourth successive title.
On 18 February 2023, Bell played in St Helens 13-12 upset victory over Penrith in the 2023 World Club Challenge.

International career
In October, Bell was named in the Scotland squad for the 2017 Rugby League World Cup.
Bell played all three matches for Scotland at the 2021 Rugby League World Cup where they finished bottom of their group.

References

External links

New Zealand Warriors profile
Warriors profile
2017 RLWC profile
Scotland profile
Scotland RL profile

1994 births
Living people
Leigh Leopards players
New Zealand Māori rugby league players
New Zealand people of Scottish descent
New Zealand expatriate sportspeople in England
New Zealand expatriate sportspeople in France
New Zealand rugby league players
New Zealand Warriors players
Papakura Sea Eagles players
Rugby league locks
Rugby league players from Auckland
Rugby league second-rows
Scotland national rugby league team players
St Helens R.F.C. players
Toulouse Olympique players